Jeffrey S. Buchanan is a retired lieutenant general of the United States Army. He was the commander of the United States Army North (Fifth Army). He also served as the senior commander of Fort Sam Houston and Camp Bullis.

Education

He has a bachelor of science in wildlife ecology from the University of Arizona and a Master of Arts in leadership development from the United States Military Academy.

Military career

He was commissioned a lieutenant in the infantry in May 1982 after graduating from the University of Arizona. He has served four tours in Iraq and one in Afghanistan. He has held command or staff positions in the 82nd Airborne Division, 25th Infantry Division, 101st Airborne Division, and 10th Mountain Division, as well as the U.S. Military Academy and the National Training Center. Recent assignments have included serving as the Deputy Commanding General of I Corps (2012-2013), commander of the US Army Military District of Washington/Joint Force Headquarters-National Capitol Region (2013-2015), and Resolute Support DCOS-Operations/Deputy Commander (Operations) for US Forces-Afghanistan (2015-2016). He was commander of United States Army North from August 26, 2016. until his retirement on July 9, 2019 when he handed command over to Lieutenant General Laura J. Richardson in a change of command ceremony at Joint Base San Antonio-Fort Sam Houston.

He also led Operation Khanjar ("strike of the sword").

In September 2017 he was dispatched to Puerto Rico, a week after the island was devastated by Hurricane Maria.  His assignment was to lead all military hurricane relief efforts there and to see how the military can be more effective in the recovery effort, particularly in dealing with the thousands of containers of supplies that are stuck in port because of "red tape, lack of drivers, and a crippling power outage".

Personal life
Buchanan and his wife, Laura have three children and 3 grandchildren

Dates of rank

Awards and decorations
Over the course of his military career, LTG Buchanan has been awarded the following:

References

External links

United States Army generals
Living people
United States Army personnel of the Iraq War
United States Army personnel of the War in Afghanistan (2001–2021)
University of Arizona alumni
United States Military Academy alumni
Year of birth missing (living people)